A by-election was held for the New South Wales Legislative Assembly seat of Kogarah on 22 October 1983. It was triggered by the resignation of sitting Labor MP Bill Crabtree who had been dropped as Minister for Police and Minister for Services.

The Kogarah by-election was held the same day as the by-elections for Maroubra, Marrickville and Riverstone. All were safe Labor seats and while there was a swing against Labor in each seat (7.2% to 11.8%), all were retained by Labor.

Dates

Results 

Bill Crabtree resigned.

See also
Electoral results for the district of Kogarah
List of New South Wales state by-elections

Notes

References 

1983 elections in Australia
New South Wales state by-elections
1980s in New South Wales
October 1983 events in Australia